Leanne Mitchell is the debut album by the winner of Series 1 of The Voice UK, Leanne Mitchell. The album was  released by Decca Records on 27 May 2013.

Track listing

Charts

References

2013 debut albums
Island Records albums